The Armstrong Whitworth Armadillo was a British single-seat biplane fighter aircraft built by Armstrong Whitworth.

Development and design
The Armadillo was designed in 1917 by Armstrong Whitworth's new chief designer, Fred Murphy, as a private venture single-seat fighter powered by a Bentley BR2 rotary engine. While the design met the requirements of Air Board Specification A1(a) for a replacement for the Sopwith Camel, it was principally produced to test the abilities of Armstrong Whitworth's new design team, and was not considered a serious competitor for the requirement. Despite this, Armstrong Whitworth was granted a licence in January 1918 to allow construction of two prototypes.

The aircraft was a two-bay biplane with a square section fuselage. The engine in the nose was enclosed by a circular cowl with a deep hump above the cowl housing two .303 in (7.7 mm) Vickers machine guns that fired through the propeller arc using synchronisation gear.

The first prototype made its maiden flight during April 1918. The type was not subject to formal evaluation by the Air Ministry, with the poor view from the cockpit being criticised. By the time the Armadillo appeared the Sopwith Snipe, powered by the same engine and faster was already in large scale production and Murphy had started work on the more advanced Ara fighter, so the Armadillo was abandoned, the second prototype not being completed.

Specifications

See also

Notes

References

 

 

1910s British fighter aircraft
Armadillo
Biplanes
Single-engined tractor aircraft
Aircraft first flown in 1918